Picayune's Creole Cookbook (also known as the Times-Picayune Creole Cookbook) was a cookbook first published in 1900 by the Picayune newspaper in New Orleans. The book contains recipes contributed by white women who had collected them from Black cooks who had created or learned the recipes while enslaved. Recipes represented were developed from the late 18th through the early 20th centuries.

The introduction to the original edition explains that the recipes were collected from Tantes (aunts), or older Black Creole women, and that the book was needed because white New Orleans society had lost access to the recipes when slavery ended.

According to Michigan State University the book is still considered among the best sources of authentic Creole recpes.

References 

Cookbooks
Creole culture
Cuisine of the Southern United States